K-otic (meaning: chaotic) are a Dutch pop group that originated from the television program Starmaker. The group originally consisted of Rachel Kramer, Bouchra Tjon Pon Fong, Anna Speller, Sita Vermeulen, Bart Voncken, Stefan de Roon and Martijn Terporten. Vermeulen left the group at the end of 2001. In 2003 the band was dissolved due to decreasing success. The group met again at the end of 2015 to organize a one-off concert in 2016.

History

2001: Formation, Bulletproof  and Vermeulen's first departure

In Starmaker, an idea of John de Mol, a group of 12 youngsters with musical talent moved into the former Big Brother house in Almere with the intention of eventually forming a new six-member pop group. From the beginning of March to the end of May 2001, the participants attended many types of workshops here and were guided by professionals such as Ad Vandenberg, Florent Luyckx and Tjeerd Oosterhuis . Every week a participant was sent home by the viewers. The initial plan was to create a group consisting of six members. However, during the final Sita and Rachel gained an equal number of votes and so it was decided to form the final group with the seven remaining candidates. In addition to the occupation, the band name K-otic was also chosen by the viewers. The names Stars Inc. and Young Guns are falling off.

The debut album Bulletproof was released immediately after the end of Starmaker and came in first place a week after the last broadcast in the Album Top 100 . It was by far the best - selling album of 2001 in the Netherlands for Alessandro Safina 's Insieme a te and Not that Kind by Anastacia. In the 2000-2009 decade overview, the CD finished in 18th Place. More than 235,000 units of Bulletproof were sold, good for twice platinum. The album spawned singles I Can't Explain, I Really Don't Think So and No Perfect World all became hits in the Top 40 and the Mega Top 100.

From September 2001, K-otic did an extensive Dutch tour in which venues such as Paradiso and Nighttown are visited. After U2 and Bon Jovi, K-otic was the most visited live act that year. The group also won a Top of the Pops Award in the category Top TV Music Act.

Sita Vermeulen left the group at the end of 2001 to start a solo career. Already during Starmaker she was appointed by the makers to go solo. However, due to the group's success, it was decided to postpone this. The other band members decided to continue as sextet.

2002–2003: Indestructible and Dissolution

At the beginning of April 2002, K-otic went into the studio for the second album, Indestructible . The first single Falling was released at the end of May 2002 and again became a Top 40 hit, just like the successor I Surrender, which will be released in August. The album was sold a lot less than its predecessor, but was nevertheless awarded a gold record.

The performance on September 28 in Tivoli in Utrecht was one of the few the group gave that year. The success declined further and the group decided to disband. Several group members had already indicated for a while that they were not comfortable with the music and style of the band. The last concert was given on January 26, 2003 in Bob's Saloon in Uitgeest.

2011–Present: Reunion

In 2011, the group met privately for the first time again in eight years. Then the first ideas for a real public reunion were born. It finally came in 2016, when it was fifteen years ago that the group was brought together. Through a TV performance at Carlo's TV Café in March, a crowdfunding campaign quickly raised the money needed for a one-off reunion concert. A small hall was initially thought of, but the interest was so great that in December 2016 K-otic returned after 15 years in the Heineken Music Hall, where the group started in 2001. The reunion was also used for a six-part documentary series that appeared on YouTube at the end of 2016.

Discography
 Bulletproof (2001)
 Indestructible (2002)

Members
 Rachel Kramer (2001-2003;2016–Present)
 Bart Voncken (2001-2003;2016–Present)
 Stefan de Roon (2001-2003;2016–Present)
 Anna Speller (2001-2003;2016–Present)
 Bouchra Tjon Pon Fong (2001-2003;2016–Present)
 Martijn Terporten (2001-2003;2016–Present)
 Sita Vermeulen (2001;2016–Present)

References

Sony BMG artists
Dutch pop music groups
Musical groups established in 2001
Musical groups disestablished in 2003
Musical groups reestablished in 2016
2001 establishments in the Netherlands
2003 disestablishments in the Netherlands
2016 establishments in the Netherlands